The twenty-sixth season of The Bachelor premiered on January 3, 2022, with Jesse Palmer as host. This season featured 28-year-old Clayton Echard, a medical sales representative from Eureka, Missouri.

Echard finished in eighth place on the eighteenth season of The Bachelorette featuring Michelle Young.

The season concluded on March 15, 2022, with Echard's final choice, 28-year-old wedding videographer Susie Evans, rejecting him. Evans was the first person in the show's history to reject the lead's proposal. However, during the live After the Final Rose special, it was revealed that they had since gotten back together, and they moved in together in Virginia Beach, Virginia in April 2022. They announced their breakup on September 23, 2022.

Production

Casting and contestants 
In August 2021, it was reported that men from The Bachelorette who had been considered for the lead role were Tyler Cameron and Mike Johnson from season 15; Ben Smith from season 16; and Greg Grippo, Andrew Spencer and Michael Allio from season 17. Spencer and Allio eventually went on to compete in season 8 of Bachelor in Paradise.

On September 15, 2021, media outlets reported that Clayton Echard was named the Bachelor. The next day, the production crew was reported in his hometown of Eureka, Missouri filming footage for this upcoming season, just one week after the filming of season 18 had concluded. Echard was officially announced as The Bachelor on November 30, 2021.

On September 28, 2021, it was announced that season five bachelor Jesse Palmer would host the season, replacing former host Chris Harrison. Harrison departed the franchise in June following backlash after his support for Rachael Kirkconnell, the winner of the previous season, whose photos resurfaced of her attending an Antebellum South-themed party.

Notable contestants include Hurricane Sandy survivor Daria Rose; Denver Broncos cheerleader Gabby Windey, who is the ex-girlfriend of The Bachelorette and Bachelor in Paradise contestant Dean Unglert; Olympic sprinter Marlena Wesh, who represented Haiti at the 2012 Summer Olympics; Miss Virginia USA 2020 and Miss USA 2020 competitor Susie Evans; Miss South Carolina Teen 2015 and top 10 finalist at Miss America's Outstanding Teen 2016 Sarah Hamrick; Miss Teen America 2013 Lindsay Dobbs; and Oppenheim Group realtor Kate Gallivan, who appeared in the series Selling Sunset.

This season was the first one to have a contestant that was coached by Bachelor Clues (Chad Kultgen) of the Game of Roses podcast. The identity of the contestant is unknown.

Filming and development 
The season reverted to its standard production format and initial filming location in Agoura Hills, California. This was the first season that the crew filmed at the Villa de la Vina mansion, also known as The Bachelor Mansion, since season 24. The previous season of this show and seasons 16 and 17 of The Bachelorette were filmed in a bio-secure bubble zone, while season 18 of The Bachelorette took place mostly in the United States with limited travel, due to the COVID-19 pandemic.

Filming began on September 29, 2021, on its traditional production schedule with interstate and international travel throughout the season. Filming was reported in Houston, Texas at NRG Stadium; in October 2021 in Iceland in November 2021; at Harpa Concert Hall in Reykjavík; and at Ingólfsskáli Viking Restaurant in Ölfus. Additionally, the season includes visits to the Canadian provinces of Ontario, Croatia and Austria.

Contestants 
33 potential contestants were revealed on September 25, 2021.

The final cast of 31 women was announced on December 15, 2021.

However, one of the contestants, Salley Carson, a 26-year-old spine-surgery robot operator from Greenville, South Carolina, made the decision to drop out of the show just hours before the limo arrived. As a result, only 30 women participated in the show.

Future appearances

The Bachelorette
Rachel Recchia and Gabby Windey were chosen as co-leads for season 19 of The Bachelorette.

Bachelor in Paradise 
Eliza Isichei, Ency Abedin, Genevieve Parisi, Hailey Malles, Hunter Haag, Jill Chin, Kate Gallivan, Kira Mengistu, Lyndsey Windham, Mara Agreat, Salley Carson, Sarah Hamrick, Serene Russell, Shanae Ankney, Sierra Jackson, and Teddi Wright returned for season 8 of Bachelor in Paradise. Haag, Malles, and Mengistu were eliminated in week 1. Wright, Jackson, and Carson quit in week 2. Mengistu returned in week 2 and left in a relationship with Romeo Alexander later that day. Chin and Hamrick quit during week 3, the latter had to leave due to the death of a family member. Abedin, Windham, and Agrait quit in week 5. Isichei and Gallivan split from Rodney Mathews and Logan Palmer, respectively, in week 5. Ankney and Parisi split from Joey Young and Aaron Clancy, respectively, in week 6. Russell got engaged to Brandon Jones in week 6.

Dancing with the Stars 
Windey was chosen to participate in season 31 of Dancing with the Stars partnering with Val Chmerkovskiy. They finished the competition as the runner-up.

Call-out order 

 The contestant received the first impression rose
 The contestant received a rose during the date
 The contestant received a rose outside of a rose ceremony or date
 The contestant was eliminated
 The contestant was eliminated outside the rose ceremony
 The contestant was eliminated during the date
 The contestant initially rejected a rose, but later accepted it
 The contestant received a rose during the date but was eliminated
 The contestant quit the competition

Episodes

Controversy
Shanae Ankney came under fire for alleged ableist comments to Elizabeth Corrigan, who has ADHD. When Corrigan claimed she could not process things as well due to her condition, Ankney mocked her and even accused her of staging her condition. Corrigan responded by posting a TikTok video about mental health after the airing of the episode. During the airing of the season, Echard released a public apology to Corrigan, stating that he would have sent Ankney home immediately had he known about her comments. However, contestants Lyndsey Windham and Sierra Jackson disputed Echard's claims stating that he knew Ankney mocked Corrigan and kept Ankney anyway.

Notes

References

External links
 

2022 American television seasons
The Bachelor (American TV series) seasons
Television shows filmed in California
Television shows filmed in Texas
Television shows filmed in Ontario
Television shows filmed in Croatia
Television shows filmed in Austria
Television shows filmed in Virginia
Television shows filmed in Colorado
Television shows filmed in Oklahoma
Television shows filmed in Florida
Television shows filmed in Iceland